"The One with Unagi" is the seventeenth episode of Friends sixth season. It first aired on the NBC network in the United States on February 24, 2000.

Plot
When Joey is struggling to make ends meet by working at Central Perk, Ross suggests some alternative form of employment, and Joey looks into medical studies at the local hospital. He finds one that pays $2,000 for identical twins, and hires a fake twin, Carl, at an audition. Carl is even dumber than Joey, and the ruse fails miserably.

Chandler panics when he remembers that he and Monica have agreed to hand-craft Valentine's Day gifts for each other this year, two weeks later than planned because Monica was working on Valentine's Day. After Phoebe offers him a bunny rabbit composed of Rachel's socks, Chandler fails miserably at making his own gifts. He ends up grabbing a cassette tape to stand in for a homemade mix tape. Monica, who also forgot, gives him Phoebe's sock-bunny and then launches into a furious campaign of please-forgive-me sex and homemade meals. Chandler, happy with the attention, does not correct her misconception, but his deception becomes clear when Monica actually plays the cassette tape—a homemade mix tape from Chandler's ex-girlfriend Janice for his birthday. Although she is angry, he pleads for another chance. She tries to get past it with another slow dance, but a few more seconds of Janice's voice is enough for her to storm into their bedroom alone.

Rachel and Phoebe take a women's self-defense class together; Rachel feels confident about her mastery of the topic, which Ross scoffs at. Ross claims to have years of karate lessons to master the true essence of self-defense: "unagi", which Ross claims is "a state of total awareness." (Rachel, Chandler, and even the vegetarian Phoebe correctly point out that "unagi" is actually a form of sushi. In karate, the concept of this state is zanshin.) To prove that Rachel and Phoebe have not reached an "unagi"-infused state of mind, he sets up a number of "scary" ambushes on them, only to find out they are stronger than him, as in one failed ambush Rachel and Phoebe sit on him, not letting him go. Ross goes to their instructor to ask how to fight them off, but he explains it out of context, making him look like a psychopath who enjoys assaulting women, especially his ex-wife. Later, Ross sees the backs of two blonde-haired women near Central Perk, thinking they are Rachel and Phoebe and attacks them from behind, only to be attacked back. As he is running away from them, he pauses for a second to see Rachel and Phoebe staring at him from a window in Central Perk and he runs away in fear as he realizes the unknown women are chasing him.

Reception
"The One with the Unagi" received critical acclaim and is regarded as one of the series' best episodes. Purple Clover chose the episode as one of the 20 funniest episodes of Friends. Radio Times chose "The One with the Unagi" as the best Friends episode. They called it one of the show's funniest moments. GamesRadar+ ranked it the show's 19th best episode. Cosmopolitan included "The One with Unagi" on their list of "The 17 Very Funniest 'Friends' Episodes You Need to Marathon". Thought Catalog included it  on their list of "10 Episodes That Prove Ross Geller Is the Most Underrated Character on Friends". BuzzFeed placed "The One with Unagi" on their list of the 15 funniest Friends episodes. Parade wrote that it was the best episode from season 6, and that its key quote was "Ah … salmon skin roll" which is said by Rachel. Odyssey included the episode on their list of "15 Friends Episodes to Watch When You Need a Pick-Me-Up".

References

2000 American television episodes
Friends (season 6) episodes